In Lights is Fear Zero's third studio album. It was released on July 9, 2007, through Satch and Fontana North/Universal.

Track listing 

 "You Make Me Feel" - 3:46
 "Breathe Again" - 3:54
 "Falling Down" - 4:04
 "Broken, still hoping" - 3:53
 "Cry On A Sunday" - 3:52
 "Day Of Our Last Night" - 3:35
 "Beautiful Scars" - 3:59
 "Overwhelmed" - 3:18
 "Last Photograph" - 3:58
 "Loner Anthem" - 5:01
 "California Calls" - 4:18
 "Get Over This" - 4:35
 "Whole Damn Nation" - 3:47
 "Breathe Again" (version au francais) - 3:51

Credits 

Ed Sadler - Lead and background vocals, all guitars, bass, string arrangements
Francis Amanse - Drums, percussion, background vocals
Gerry Plant - Bass
Jason Dana - Drums
Randall Stoll - Drums
John Dean - Hammond B3 organ, piano, wurlitzer,
Darren Grahn - Percussion on all tracks
Shane Johnson - Synth, background vocals, string arrangements
Shawn Meehan - Background vocals
Ken Mason - Background vocals
Lorna Fortin - Cello
Nicole Scofield - Violin
Tony Bernal - Violin

Fear Zero albums
2007 albums